Elizabeth Ayton Godwin (4 July 1817 – 26 March 1889) was a Victorian era Christian hymn writer and religious poet. She was born at Thorpe Hamlet, Norfolk, England, 4 July 1817. Her father was William Ellis Etheridge. In 1849, she married Mr. C. Godwin. She published Songs for the weary in 1873; and Songs amidst Daily Life in 1878. Her hymn in common use is "My Saviour, 'mid life's varied scene" (Lent), written while still a girl, and first printed in the Evangelical Magazine, and then in Songs for the Weary, 1865. She died at Stoke Bishop, 26 March 1889.

Selected works
 Songs for the Weary: the School of Sorrow and other Poems (1873)
 Songs Amidst Daily Life (1878)

References

External links
 

1817 births
1889 deaths
19th-century English non-fiction writers
19th-century English women writers
19th-century English poets
19th-century British women musicians
People from Thorpe Hamlet
Protestant hymnwriters
British women hymnwriters
English women poets
English religious writers
English women non-fiction writers